Time is the eighth studio album from Swedish singer Måns Zelmerlöw. It was released on 18 October 2019 through Warner Music Sweden. The album includes the singles "Walk with Me" and "Better Now". The album peaked at number eighteen on the Swedish Albums Chart.

Background
In August 2019, Zelmerlöw announced that he would release his new album in October. He also announced a four date tour across Sweden in October in connection with the release of the album. He said in an interview, "It is always best to play at home in Sweden and in the fall you will see that something completely new." Some recording sessions took place during songwriting camps in Battersea with others at Peter Gabriel’s Real World studios. When talking about the album, he said, "It begins with a letter from myself to my younger self as a young boy, then it moves to quite a dark place, before things turn around for the better again."

Commercial performance
On 25 October 2019, the album entered the Swedish Albums Chart at number eighteen, making it Zelmerlöw's first album not to debut in the top 10 in Sweden.

Critical reception
Scandipop gave the album a mixed review stating, "He's calling it by far his best album to date. But given the fact that earlier this year he did the unforgivable and publicly slated his earlier work, it's now somewhat difficult to invest too much into what he puts his name to, without wondering if in ten years' time he'll be referring to what you like of his right now, as pretty damn awful." Florian Rahn from Wiwibloggs gave the album a positive review stating, "He knows his sound and how to deliver a well-produced body of work."

Singles
"Walk with Me" was released as the lead single from the album on 1 March 2019. Måns and Dotter performed the song live during Melodifestivalen 2019. The song peaked at number 51 on the Swedish Singles Chart. "Better Now" was released as the second single from the album on 17 May 2019. The song peaked at number 79 on the Swedish Singles Chart. "One" was released as the third single from the album on 21 November 2019. The song did not enter the Swedish Singles Chart, but peaked at number 20 on the Sweden Heatseeker Songs. "On My Way" was released as the fourth single from the album on 24 April 2020. "Mirror" was released as the fifth single from the album on 21 August 2020.

Track listing

Charts

Weekly charts

Year-end charts

Release history

References

2019 albums
Måns Zelmerlöw albums
Warner Music Sweden albums
Albums produced by Mac & Phil